Buckleria is a genus of moths in the family Pterophoridae.

Species
Buckleria brasilia Gielis, 2006
Buckleria girardi Gibeaux, 1992
Buckleria madecassea Gibeaux, 1994
Buckleria negotiosus (Meyrick, 1926) (=Buckleria vanderwolfi Gielis, 2008)
Buckleria paludum (Zeller, 1841)
Buckleria parvulus (Barnes & Lindsey, 1921)

Oxyptilini
Moth genera
Taxa named by J. W. Tutt